The Good Society is an academic journal. It is published twice a year by the Penn State University Press on behalf of The Committee for the Political Economy of the Good Society (PEGS). Between 1991 and 1995, the journal went by the name The Newsletter of PEGS.

External links 
 
The Good Society at Project MUSE

Political science journals
English-language journals
Penn State University Press academic journals
Biannual journals
Publications established in 1991
Economics journals
1991 establishments in Pennsylvania